Compensated emancipation was a method of ending slavery, under which the enslaved person's owner received compensation from the government in exchange for manumitting the slave. This could be monetary, and it could allow the owner to retain the slave for a period of labor, an indenture. Cash compensation rarely was equal to the slave's market value.

An indenture was seen as a compromise between slavery and outright emancipation, an intermediate step. However, no one was happy with compensated emancipation. Owners complained that their compensation was small compared with their loss; they were paid less, often much less, than what the slaveowner could have sold the enslaved person for (the market value). Governments and non-slaveholding citizens complained about the financial burden of compensating the owners, while for the formerly enslaved it seemed ludicrous that those who had all along benefited from slavery should now receive additional compensation, while its victims received no compensation whatsoever. Historian Eric Foner wrote, "Even Haiti, where slavery died amid a violent revolution, agreed in 1824 to pay a large indemnity to former slaveholders in exchange for French recognition of its independence.... No one proposed to compensate slaves for their years of unrequited toil." Compensation of slaveholders has been viewed as akin to compensating a thief for returning stolen property, or paying ransom to a kidnapper for releasing his victim, and therefore not so much compensation as a reward for committing what should be a crime.

To be sure, the indenture system represented for the formerly enslaved an improvement over slavery itself; those indentured could not be forcibly relocated, children and other family members could not be taken away by force, and they could no longer be whipped or raped. However, they were still not free.

Transition away from slavery 
Compensated emancipation was typically enacted as part of an act that outlawed slavery outright or established a scheme whereby slavery would eventually be phased out. It frequently was accompanied or preceded by laws which approached gradual emancipation by granting freedom to those born to slaves after a given date. Among the European powers, slavery was primarily an issue with their overseas colonies. The British Empire enacted a policy of compensated emancipation (about 40%) for its colonies in 1833, followed by France in 1848, Denmark in 1849, and the Netherlands in 1863. Most South American and Caribbean nations emancipated slavery through compensated schemes in the 1850s and 1860s, while Brazil passed a plan for gradual, compensated emancipation in 1871, and Cuba followed in 1880 after having enacted freedom at birth a decade earlier.

United States 
In the United States, the regulation of slavery was predominantly a state function. Northern states followed a course of gradual emancipation starting in the 1830s. Many Northern states waited as late as 1857 to start gradual emancipation. During the Civil War, in November 1861, President Lincoln drafted an act to be introduced before the legislature of Delaware, one of the four slave states that did not secede from the Union (the others being Kentucky, Maryland, and Missouri), for compensated emancipation. However, this was narrowly defeated. Lincoln also was behind national legislation towards the same end, but the Southern states, which regarded themselves as having seceded from the Union, ignored the proposals.

Only in the District of Columbia, which fell under direct Federal auspices, was compensated emancipation enacted. On April 16, 1862, President Lincoln signed the District of Columbia Compensated Emancipation Act. This law prohibited slavery in the District, forcing its 900-odd slaveholders to free their slaves, with the federal government paying owners an average of about $300 for each. In 1863, state legislation towards compensated emancipation in Maryland failed to pass, as did an attempt to include it in a newly written Missouri constitution.

Other nations and empires
Other nations and empires that implemented compensated emancipation:
Argentina
Bolivia
Brazil
British Empire
Chile
Colombia
Danish colonies
Netherlands
Ecuador
Kingdom of France, 1315, see Louis X
French colonial empire
Mexico and  Central America
Paraguay
Peru
Spanish Empire
Sweden
Uruguay
Venezuela
United Kingdom
United States (District of Columbia only)

See also
Abolitionism
Abolitionism in France
Abolitionism in the United Kingdom
Abolitionism in the United States
Reparations for slavery (proposed payments to former slaves and their descendants)

References

Slavery
Abolitionism
Abolitionism in the United States
History of slavery in the District of Columbia